Cirrochroa orissa, the  banded yeoman, is an Indomalayan species of heliconiine butterfly described by Cajetan and Rudolf Felder in 1860.

Subspecies
Cirrochroa orissa orissa (Thailand, Peninsular Malaysia, Singapore)
Cirrochroa orissa orissides Fruhstorfer, 1906 (Borneo)
Cirrochroa orissa chione Riley & Godfrey, 1921 (southern Indo-China)

References

Vagrantini
Butterflies described in 1860
Butterflies of Asia
Taxa named by Baron Cajetan von Felder
Taxa named by Rudolf Felder